There was no defending champion, as the 1968 final was cancelled due to rain.

Fred Stolle won the singles title at the 1969 Queen's Club Championships tennis tournament, defeating John Newcombe 6–3, 22–20 in the final.

Seeds

  Rod Laver (semifinals)
  Ken Rosewall (fourth round)

Draw

Finals

Top half

Section 1

Section 2

Section 3

Section 4

Bottom half

Section 5

Section 6

Section 7

Section 8

External links
 Main draw

Singles